Torxé is a commune in the Charente-Maritime department in the Nouvelle-Aquitaine region in southwestern France.

Geography
The river Boutonne forms most of the commune's southern border.

Population

Communes of the Charente-Maritime department

References

Communes of Charente-Maritime